Rolf-Rüdiger Thiele (born 29 April 1943 in Polepp, Bohemia) is a German mathematician and historian of mathematics, known for his historical research on Hilbert's twenty-fourth problem.

Education and career
Thiele studied mathematics, physics, and psychology at the Martin Luther University of Halle-Wittenberg and received his promotion (Ph.D.) there in 1973. He then worked in the publishing business in Leipzig for B. G. Teubner Verlag and Salomon Hirzel Verlag. From 1986 to 2008 he worked at the Karl-Sudhoff-Institut für Geschichte der Medizin und der Naturwissenschaften (Karl Sudhoff Institute for the History of Medicine and Natural Sciences) at the University of Leipzig. He has held visiting positions at the Johannes Gutenberg University Mainz (from 1992 to 1995 as chair for the history of natural sciences), at TU Darmstadt, at the University of Bonn (from 1995 to 1996), and at the University of Toronto.

In 2001 Thiele habilitated in the department of mathematics at the University of Hamburg with his work Von der Bernoullischen Brachistochrone zum Kalibratorkonzept (From the Bernoullian brachistochrone to the calibrator concept). His habilitation thesis was published in the series  Collection de travaux de l'Académie internationale d'Histoire des Sciences , Brepols Verlag, Turnhout. In 2002 he became a privatdozent in the department of mathematics at the University of Leipzig. In 2004 he was awarded the Lester R. Ford Award of the Mathematical Association of America for his expository article on Hilbert's cancelled 24th problem. He discovered the 24th problem in an unpublished notebook among Hilbert's Nachlass. Thiele is the vice president of the Euler Society.

His most important works deal with the biographies of Leonhard Euler, Bartel Leendert van der Waerden, David Hilbert, Felix Klein. Central topics in his historical research are analysis and the calculus of variations. In his writings Thiele uses numerous previously unpublished sources.

In addition to numerous book publications and specialist articles on various questions in the history of mathematics, he has published several books on mathematical games in recreational mathematics (often in collaboration with Konrad Haase).

Selected publications
 Leonhard Euler. BSB B.G.Teubner, Leipzig 1982, .
 Er rechnete, wie andere atmen. EULERS Beiträge zum Funktionsbegriff. Euler-Vortrag im Schlosstheater des Neuen Palais von Sanssouci, Potsdam, 21 May 1999, Online-Version.
 Hilbert’s Twenty-Fourth Problem. In: The American Mathematical Monthly. January 2003, pp. 1–24.
 The Mathematics and Science of Leonhard Euler (1707–1783). In: Glen van Brummelen, Michael Kinyon (eds.): Mathematics and the Historian's Craft. Springer, New York 2005, pp. 81–140.
 Van der Waerden in Leipzig. (= EAGLE 036). Mit einem Geleitwort von Friedrich Hirzebruch. Edition am Gutenbergplatz Leipzig, Leipzig 2009, . 
 Felix Klein in Leipzig. (= EAGLE 047). Edition am Gutenbergplatz Leipzig, Leipzig 2011, . 
 Felix Klein in Leipzig 1880–1886. In: Jahresbericht der Deutschen Mathematiker-Vereinigung, volume 102, issue 2, 2000, p. 69.
 Mathematische Beweise. Harri Deutsch, 1979.
 Von der Bernoullischen Brachistochrone zum Kalibrator-Konzept: ein historischer Abriß zur Entstehung der Feldtheorie in der Variationsrechnung. Habilitation. Turnhout, Brepols 2007.
 with Konrad Haase: Der verzauberte Raum- Spiele in drei Dimensionen.  Urania Verlag, Leipzig 1991.
 with Konrad Haase: 100 Fünf-Minuten-Spiele: Zeitvertreib für Singles. Berlin 1990.
 Die gefesselte Zeit: Spiele, Spaß und Strategien. Urania Verlag, 1984.
 Das große Spielvergnügen: mit Würfeln, Streichhölzern, Papier, Schachfiguren, Dominos und Labyrinthen. Hugendubel, 1984.

Sources
 Kürschners Deutscher Gelehrten-Kalender 1992
 Marquis Who's Who in the World

References

External links
 Bibliographie Rüdiger Thiele (as of January 2012)
 entry in: Vademekum der Geschichtswissenschaften 2006/2007, p. 628.

20th-century German mathematicians
21st-century German mathematicians
German historians of mathematics
Martin Luther University of Halle-Wittenberg alumni
Academic staff of Leipzig University
1943 births
Living people
Academic staff of the University of Hamburg